Amplifier is the debut album of the Manchester alternative rock band Amplifier.

Originally released by Music For Nations on 6 June 2004, it was re-released by the German-based label SPV in May 2005 after the collapse of the former. The Music For Nations release came in two formats: jewel case with 10 tracks, and digipack with 13 tracks. Unlike normal special editions, the 13-track version's bonus tracks are in the middle of the album, apparently forming the "true" album as the band intended it. The SPV release contains a bonus EP with four additional tracks (all previously released) and videos of two songs from the original.

The critical reception of the album was generally positive, with comments such as:

"A British rock-scene altering record. Enjoy it in all its infinite glory" Kerrang!

"No other record this year will have the audacity to field such lofty ambitions, let alone have the skills to fulfil them" NME

Track listing
All songs by Sel Balamir.

Music for Nations - Original Release
"Motorhead" – 6:15
"Airborne" – 8:28
"Panzer" – 7:02
"Old Movies" – 5:50
"Post Acid Youth" – 6:05
"Half Life" – 3:47
"Drawing No1" - 2:09
"Neon" – 4:16
"On/Off" – 6:33
"The Consultancy" – 4:59
"Drawing No2" - 2:49
"One Great Summer" – 5:56
"UFOs" – 7:26

SPV - 2CD Re-release
"Motorhead" – 6:15
"Airborne" – 8:28
"Panzer" – 7:02
"Old Movies" – 5:50
"Post Acid Youth" – 6:05
"Neon" – 4:16
"On/Off" – 6:33
"The Consultancy" – 4:59
"One Great Summer" – 5:56
"UFOs" – 7:26
Bonus EP Tracks
"Boomtime" – 4:51
"Half Life" – 3:47
"Throwaway" – 2:29
"Glory Electricity" – 7:36

Credits
Sel Balamir – Guitar, vocals and co-production
Neil Mahony – Bass
Matt Brobin – Drums
Matt Steele – Electric Piano on "Old Movies" and reverse piano on "On/Off"
Claire Lemmon – Backing vocals on "Neon"
Mike Vennart and Steve Durose – Backing vocals on "Panzer" and "UFOs"
Steve Lyon – Co-production
Chris Sheldon – Mixing
Max Dingle – Assistant mixing
Chris Blair – Mastering
Rainer Holst – Mastering of bonus EP

References

External links
Lyrics Contains lyrics to all Amplifier songs.

Amplifier (band) albums
2004 debut albums